Liverani is an Italian surname, may refer to:
 Fabio Liverani, Italian football head coach (manager) and former professional footballer
 Mario Liverani, Italian professor of ancient history
 Massimo Liverani, Italian rally driver

References

Italian-language surnames